Henry Powning Stark (1827–1870) was a 19th-century Member of Parliament in Hawke's Bay, New Zealand.

He represented the Napier electorate in 1861; from 19 February to 27 April, when he resigned.

He died in Thames or in the Imperial Hotel, Pollen Street on 5 or 7 July 1870 aged 43y. He had pneumonia and had been having "business difficulties"; he left his wife and family "entirely unprovided for".

References

1827 births
1870 deaths
Members of the New Zealand House of Representatives
New Zealand MPs for North Island electorates
19th-century New Zealand politicians